The 2022 MSG Prime Minister's Cup was held from 17–30 September 2022. Vanuatu hosted the competition with all matches being played at the Korman Stadium in Port Vila. The tournament was a resurrection of the Melanesia Cup which has not been held since the year 2000. It was a FIFA Tier-1 tournament.

Format
The six competing teams are divided into two groups. A total of 10 matches will be played on five matchdays.

Matches

Group A
Group A consists of Papua New Guinea, host Vanuatu, and Vanuatu's development side.

Group B
Fiji, New Caledonia, and the Solomon Islands have been drawn into Group B.

Knockout stage

Semi-finals

Third place match

Final

Statistics

Goalscorers

References 

Melanesia Cup
2022
MSG Prime Ministers Cup
MSG